Helva may refer to:
Halva, a dense and sweet confection
Helva, Bayburt, a village in Turkey
cognomen of gens Aebutia